The 2019 Centenario Open was a professional tennis tournament played on outdoor clay courts. It was the first edition of the tournament which was part of the 2019 ITF Women's World Tennis Tour. It took place in Asunción, Paraguay between 28 October and 3 November 2019.

Singles main-draw entrants

Seeds

 1 Rankings are as of 21 October 2019.

Other entrants
The following players received wildcards into the singles main draw:
  Carolina Alves
  Susan Doldán
  Lara Escauriza
  Sarah Tami-Masi

The following players received entry from the qualifying draw:
  Victoria Bosio
  Bárbara Gatica
  Guillermina Naya
  Thaisa Grana Pedretti
  Teliana Pereira
  Eduarda Piai
  Laura Pigossi
  Melanie Stokke

Champions

Singles

 Elisabetta Cocciaretto def.  Sara Errani, 6–1, 4–6, 6–0

Doubles

 Andrea Gámiz /  Georgina García Pérez def.  Anna Danilina /  Conny Perrin, 6–4, 3–6, [10–3]

References

External links
 2019 Centenario Open at ITFtennis.com

2019 ITF Women's World Tennis Tour
2019 in Paraguayan sport
October 2019 sports events in South America
November 2019 sports events in South America